Kathleen is a female given name, used in English- and Irish-language communities. Sometimes spelled Cathleen, it is an Anglicized form of Caitlín, the Irish form of Cateline, which was the Old French form of Catherine. It ultimately derives from the Greek name Aikaterine, the meaning of which is highly debated (see Katherine).  Kathleen was the 8th most popular girls' name in Ireland in 1911, but by 1965 it had sunk to number 18.

Literature
 Kathleen Raine, British poet
 Kathleen Winsor, American author
 The Countess Kathleen and Various Legends and Lyrics (1892), the second poetry collection of William Butler Yeats
 Joanne Kathleen (J. K.) Rowling, British author
 Kathleen Vereecken, Belgian writer
 Kathleen O'Meara, Irish-French Catholic writer

Military
 Kathleen Best, director of the Women's Royal Australian Army Corps
 Kathleen Soliah, member of the Symbionese Liberation Army

Music
 Kathleen Sergerie, Québécoise pop singer
 Kathleen Battle, American soprano
 Kathleen de Leon Jones, Filipino-Australian singer, dancer, actress and television performer, Hi-5
 Kathleen Emperatriz DeLuna, Dominican-American R&B singer
 Kathleen Edwards, Canadian singer-songwriter
 Kathleen Ferrier, British contralto, after whom the prestigious Kathleen Ferrier Award is named
 Kathleen Hanna, American musician

Peeresses
 Kathleen Pelham-Clinton, Duchess of Newcastle, dog breeder
 Kathleen Cavendish, Marchioness of Hartington, the second daughter of Joseph P. Kennedy, Sr. and a sister of U.S. President John F. Kennedy 
 Kathleen Simon, Viscountess Simon, abolitionist
 Kathleen Richardson, Baroness Richardson of Calow, British peer
 Kathleen Manners, Duchess of Rutland
 Kathleen Hamilton, Duchess of Abercorn

Politics
 Kathleen Fleur Anderson, British politician, known as Fleur Anderson
 Kathleen Blanco, former Governor of Louisiana
 Kathleen Brown, Californian politician
 Kathalijne Buitenweg, Dutch politician
 Kathleen (Kathy) Hochul, Governor of New York
 Kathleen Kane, Pennsylvania Attorney General convicted of felony perjury
 Kathleen Kennedy Townsend, former Lieutenant Governor of Maryland
 Kathleen Lynch, Irish politician
 Kathleen Merrigan, Deputy Secretary of Agriculture of the United States
 Kathleen Ollerenshaw, British mathematician and politician
 Kathleen O'Meara, Irish politician
 Kathleen Sebelius, United States Secretary of Health and Human Services, former Governor of Kansas
 Kathleen Wynne, Premier of Ontario

Science
 Kathleen Hall Jamieson, American professor of communications
 Kathleen R. Johnson, American paleoclimatologist
 Kathleen Kenyon, British archaeologist
 Kathleen Lamborn, American biostatistician
 Kathleen Lonsdale, British crystallographer
 Kathleen Madden, American mathematician
 Kathleen Martínez, Dominican archaeologist, lawyer, and diplomat
 Kathleen I. Pritchard, Canadian oncologist
 Kathleen Treseder, American ecologist

Sports
 Kathleen Comley, British Paralympic archer
 Kathleen O'Kelly-Kennedy, Australian wheelchair basketball player
 Kathleen Smet, Belgian triathlete
 Kathleen Ledecky, American Olympic swimmer

Television and film
 Kathleen Barr, Canadian voice actress
 Kathleen Doyle "Kathy" Bates, American actress
 Kathleen Freeman, American character actress
 Kate Hackett, American actress (Kathleen Hackett)
 Kathleen Harrison, British character actress
 Kathleen Hepburn, Canadian screenwriter and film director
 Kathleen Kennedy, movie producer
 Kathleen de Leon Jones, retired Filipino-Australian singer and actress
 Kathleen Madigan, American Stand-up Comedian
 Kathleen McDermott, Scottish actress
 Kathleen Noone, American actress
 Kathleen Quinlan, American actress
 Kathleen Robertson, Canadian actress
 Kathleen Turner, American film actress, director, and producer
 Kathleen Warner (born Davis), Trinidadian actress and radio personality, also known as "Aunty Kay" 
 Kathleen York, American actress
 Kathy Griffin (born Kathleen Mary Griffin), American comedian, actress, and television personality
 Kate Walsh (born Kathleen Erin Walsh), American actress

Other
 Kathleen Mary Burrow, Australian physiotherapist, businesswoman, Catholic lay leader
 Kathleen O'Toole, police commissioner of Boston, Massachusetts
 Kathleen Salmond, New Zealand artist
 Kathleen Wrasama, Ethiopian-born British community organiser
 Kathleen Zellner, American attorney

See also
 Caitlín
 Cathleen

References

English feminine given names
Irish feminine given names